The year 2004 in art involved some significant events and new art works.

Events
April – A Belgian activist group cuts off the left hand of a bronze Congolese figure in a monument to Leopold II of Belgium in Ostend as a protest against colonial atrocities.
24 May – A fire in the Momart storage warehouse destroys major works by Helen Chadwick, Tracey Emin, Patrick Heron, Damien Hirst and other British artists.
18 July – The subterranean Chichu Art Museum on the Japanese island of Naoshima, designed by Tadao Ando, opens.
11 December – İstanbul Modern (art museum) is established in Turkey. The country's first modern art museum, the Doğançay Museum, opened earlier in the year, also in Istanbul; it is dedicated to the artistic legacy of Burhan Doğançay.

Works

David Backhouse – Animals in War Memorial (London)
Banksy – Di-faced Tenner (multiple copies)
Bruce Beasley – Encounter (sculpture, Eugene, Oregon)
Lucian Freud – The Brigadier (portrait of Andrew Parker Bowles)
Rachel Joynt – Noah's Egg (sculpture at Veterinary Sciences Centre, University College Dublin in Ireland)
Liz Magor – LightShed (installation, Vancouver)
Cornelia Parker – Perpetual Canon (installation)
Paula Rego – The Cake Woman
Donald Wilson – Holon (sculpture, Portland, Oregon)
Statue of Mahatma Gandhi (Houston, Texas)
Artworks at Millennium Park in Chicago, United States:
Anish Kapoor – Cloud Gate
Jaume Plensa – Crown Fountain

Awards
Archibald Prize – Craig Ruddy, David Gulpilil, two worlds
Artes Mundi Prize – Xu Bing
Beck's Futures – Saskia Olde Wolbers
Hugo Boss Prize – Rirkrit Tiravanija
Caldecott Medal for children's book illustration – Mordicai Gerstein, The Man Who Walked Between the Towers
En Foco's New Works Photography Award – Manuel Rivera-Ortiz
John Moores Painting Prize – Alexis Harding, Slump/Fear (orange/black)
Wynne prize – George Tjungurrayi, Untitled

Exhibitions
Edward Delaney retrospective at the Royal Hibernian Academy, Dublin
Drawings of Jim Dine at the National Gallery of Art, Washington, D.C.
Erich Heckel – His Work in the 1920s at the Brücke Museum, Berlin
Paul Henry at the National Gallery of Ireland, Dublin
Edward Hopper at the Tate Gallery, London

Films
Modigliani

Deaths

January to March
4 January – Jeff Nuttall, English poet, publisher, actor, painter and sculptor (b.1933)
9 January – Nissim Ezekiel, Indian poet, playwright and art critic (b.1924)
3 February - Ward Jackson, American painter (b. 1928)
7 February – Norman Thelwell, English cartoonist (b.1923)
4 March – Stephen Sprouse, American fashion designer and artist (b.1953)
12 March – Milton Resnick, American painter (b.1917)
13 March – René Laloux, French animator and film director (b.1929)

April to June
1 April – Enrique Grau, Colombian painter and sculptor (b.1920)
7 April – Wolfgang Mattheuer, German painter and sculptor (b.1927)
13 April – Muriel Berman, American art collector and philanthropist, co-founder of the Philip and Muriel Berman Museum at Ursinus College in Collegeville, Pennsylvania
25 April – Jacques Rouxel, French animator (b.1931)
12 May – Syd Hoff, American children’s book author and cartoonist (b.1912)
28 May – Jean-Philippe Charbonnier, French photographer (b.1921)
5 June – Fiore de Henriquez, Italian-born British sculptor (b.1921)
11 June – Egon von Fürstenberg, Swiss fashion designer (b.1946)
15 June – Lothar Fischer, German sculptor (b.1933)

July to September
2 July – John Cullen Murphy, American comics artist (b.1919)
19 July – Sylvia Daoust, Canadian sculptor (b.1902)
3 August – Henri Cartier-Bresson, French photographer (b.1908)
4 August – Cécile Guillame, first woman to engrave a French postal stamps (b.1933).
8 August – Leon Golub, American painter (b.1922).
9 August – Liisi Beckmann, Finnish artist and designer (b.1924).
8 September – Frank Thomas, American animator (b.1912)
19 September – Eddie Adams, American Pulitzer Prize-winning photographer (b.1933)

October to December
1 October – Richard Avedon, American photographer (b.1923).
13 October – Ivor Wood, English stop-motion animator (b.1932).
15 October – Irv Novick, American comic book artist (b.1916).
13 November – Harry Lampert, American cartoonist, advertising artist and author (b.1916).
19 November
Trina Schart Hyman, American illustrator of children's books (b.1939).
Piet Esser, Dutch sculptor (b.1914).
22 November – Leo Dee, American silverpoint artist (b.1931).
25 November – Ed Paschke, Polish-American painter (b.1939).
9 December – Sergey Voychenko, Belarusian artist and designer (b.1955).
16 December – Agnes Martin, Canadian-American painter (b.1912).
17 December – Tom Wesselmann, American pop artist (b.1931).
December – Cleve Gray, American Abstract expressionist painter (b.1918).

See also
List of years in art

References

 
 
2000s in art
Years of the 21st century in art